The Ghost Detective is a 2018 South Korean television series starring Choi Daniel, Park Eun-bin and Lee Ji-ah. It aired on KBS2's Wednesdays and Thursdays at 22:00 (KST) time slot from September 5 to October 31, 2018.

Synopsis
Detective Lee Da-il (Choi Daniel), who catches ghosts, tries to solve the case of his assistant, Jung Yeo-wool's (Park Eun-bin) younger sibling's bizarre death. He runs into a mysterious woman in red called Sunwoo Hye (Lee Ji-ah) who appears at every crime scene.

Cast

Main
 Choi Daniel as Lee Da-il, a sharp and tenacious detective who displays his abilities only when he is investigating a case that interests him.
 Park Eun-bin as Jung Yeo-wool, a cheerful, persistent and strong assistant detective.
 Lee Ji-ah as Sunwoo Hye, a mysterious woman who always wears a red dress and carries both an innocent and spooky vibe with her.
 Heo Jung-eun as young Sunwoo Hye

Supporting
 Kim Won-hae as Han Sang-seop, a local private investigator and chief of a detective agency.
 Lee Jae-kyun as Park Jung-dae, a smart and vigorous police detective. 
 Lee Joo-young as Gil Chae-won, a medical examiner who has the ability to communicate with ghosts.
 Shin Jae-ha as Kim Gyeol
 Chae Ji-an as Jung Yi-rang
 Park Joo-hee as Baek Da-hee, a lawyer from a top firm.
 Yoo Su-bin as Kang Eun-jung, an aspiring journalist.
 Hyun Bong-sik as detective
 Ye Soo-jung as Da-il's mother	
 Kim Min-sang as Detective Squad Chief Sim
 Mi Ram as Chan-mi, a kindergarten teacher.
 Woo Ki-hoon as Pil-seung
 Shin Cheol-jin as Grandpa's Ghost

Production
 Early working title of the series is A Few Good Men.
 First script reading was held in June 2018 at KBS Annex Building.

Original soundtrack

Part 1

Part 2

Part 3

Part 4

Part 5

Part 6

Ratings

Awards and nominations

Notes

References

External links
  
 
 
 

Korean Broadcasting System television dramas
Korean-language television shows
2018 South Korean television series debuts
2018 South Korean television series endings
South Korean crime television series
South Korean thriller television series
South Korean horror fiction television series
South Korean mystery television series